Salamat is the word for "thank you" in many Filipino dialects, including Tagalog, Cebuano, Bikol, Hiligaynon, and Waray. It most likely comes from the triliteral Semitic root S-L-M, due to indirect Islamic influence from the 14th century until the coming of the Spanish in the 16th century. 

In predominantly Muslim parts of the Philippines or among Filipino Muslims, the commonly used term for "thank you" is instead sukran, syukran, or sukor/magsukul. These are direct loanwords from Arabic shukran/shukr. Salamat has the meaning of peaceful or blessed, as it does with other Muslim groups in Southeast Asia. Salamat can be used as a greeting such as Salamat hari raya puwasa/hajji as indigenous equivalents of the global Islamic greeting of Eid Mubarak). (See Malay selamat). 

In the Arabic form, the word is in the feminine plural salāmat سلامة from the singular salāmah. Salamat in Arabic is equivalent to "peace and blessings" (a greeting or plural greeting). In Hebrew, סלמאת is slang for "Goodbye".

Other usage 
 HC Salamat, a Finnish ice hockey team
 "Salamat" (song), a song by the Filipino rock band The Dawn released on the album Beyond the Bend in 1989
 Salamat (album), a 2007 album by Yeng Constantino
 "Salamat" (Yeng Constantino song), its title track
 Salamat, Bavi, a village in Khuzestan Province, Iran
 Salamat, Behbahan, a village in Khuzestan Province, Iran
 Salamat, Shushtar, a village in Khuzestan Province, Iran
 Salamat, West Azerbaijan, Iran
 Salamat Prefecture, a prefecture of Chad
 Salamat Region, a region of Chad
 Bahr Salamat, a river in Chad